Vladimir Sergeyevich Dyadyun (born 12 July 1988) is a Russian former football striker.

Club career

Rubin
He made his debut in the Russian Football Premier League in 2007 for Rubin Kazan.

Spartak Nalchik
In the 2010 Russian Premier League campaign, he scored 4 goals in the first 4 games for Spartak Nalchik, helping his club to take an unexpected lead in the League at that point. He continued his excellent form with his first career hat-trick on 26 September 2010 against Dynamo Moscow, scoring all of the goals in a 3–0 victory.

Dynamo
In the summer of 2013, Dyadyun signed permanent deal with Dynamo Moscow.

Rubin
The next year, though, Dyadun returned to the club where he started his professional career.

Career statistics

Notes

International career
In October 2011, he was called up to the Russia national football team for the first time.

External links

References

1988 births
Living people
Sportspeople from Omsk
Russian footballers
Russia youth international footballers
Russia under-21 international footballers
Russia national football B team footballers
FC Rubin Kazan players
FC Rostov players
FC Tom Tomsk players
PFC Spartak Nalchik players
FC Dynamo Moscow players
Russian Premier League players
FC Baltika Kaliningrad players
FC Khimki players
FC Fakel Voronezh players
Association football forwards